Lay Down the Law may refer to:

Lay Down the Law (Keel album)
Lay Down the Law (Switches album)
"Lay Down the Law", a song by Gotthard from the album G.